Yang Chum Noi is a district (amphoe) in the northern part of Sisaket province, northeastern Thailand.

Geography
Neighboring districts are (from the east clockwise): Kanthararom, Mueang Sisaket, and Rasi Salai of Sisaket Province; Kho Wang of Yasothon province; and Khueang Nai of Ubon Ratchathani province.

History
The minor district (king amphoe) Yang Chum Noi was established on 1 September 1971, when the three tambons, Yang Chum Noi, Khon Kam, and Lin Fa, were split off from Mueang Sisaket district. On 25 March 1979 it was upgraded to a full district.

Administration
The district is divided into seven sub-districts (tambons), which are further subdivided into 86 villages (mubans). Yang Chum Noi is a township (thesaban tambon) which covers parts of tambon Yang Chum Noi. There are a further seven tambon administrative organizations (TAO).

References

External links
amphoe.com

Yang Chum Noi